Eh, Kasi Bata (marketed as Eh, Kasi Bata!) is a 1992 Filipino science fiction comedy film directed by Efren Jarlego. The film stars Gretchen Barretto, Romnick Sarmenta, Jennifer Sevilla, Billy Joe Crawford, Atong Redillas, and Cesar Montano. Named after the song of the same name by Jamie Baby Magtoto, it was produced by Seiko Films and released in June 1992.

Critic Justino Dormiendo of the Manila Standard panned the film, calling it "an infantile piece of movie trash" for its formulaic and "sickly" gags.

Plot
Two female aliens land in the Philippines and hijinks ensue.

Cast
Gretchen Barretto
Romnick Sarmenta
Jennifer Sevilla
Billy Joe Crawford as Daryll
Atong Redillas
Cesar Montano as Glen
Nova Villa
Dencio Padilla
Ramon Zamora as Frank Chavit
Ruben Rustia
Rez Cortez
Berting Labra
Don Pepot
Danny Labra
Rusty Santos
Ben Sagmit
Ernie David
Dino Espiritu
Jamie Baby Magtoto
Jovit Moya
Ike Lozada

Critical response
Justino Dormiendo of the Manila Standard gave Eh, Kasi Bata a negative review, calling it "an infantile piece of movie trash." He severely criticized the film's formulaic gags as "sickly", stating that "[t]he scenario seems to have been concocted by the least developed brain in the universe as stock situation after stock situation [...] makes the jokes unfit for human consumption."

References

External links

1992 films
1990s science fiction comedy films
1992 science fiction films
Filipino-language films
Films about extraterrestrial life
Philippine science fiction comedy films
Seiko Films films